The 1985 National Soccer League First Division was the first edition of the NSL First Division in South Africa. It was won by Durban-based Bush Bucks.

Table

References

NSL First Division seasons